Christ Church New Brighton (Episcopal) is a historic Episcopal church complex at 76 Franklin Avenue in New Brighton, Staten Island, New York.  The complex consists of a Late Victorian Gothic church (1904) and parish hall, connected to the church by an enclosed cloister, and a Tudor-style rectory (built 1879 and remodeled in 1909).

It was added to the National Register of Historic Places in 2004.

See also
List of New York City Designated Landmarks in Staten Island
National Register of Historic Places listings in Richmond County, New York

References

External links
Christ Church New Brighton website

Episcopal church buildings in Staten Island
Properties of religious function on the National Register of Historic Places in Staten Island
Gothic Revival church buildings in New York (state)
Churches completed in 1904
20th-century Episcopal church buildings
Churches in Staten Island
New York City Designated Landmarks in Staten Island
1904 establishments in New York City